A garden club is an organized group of people with a shared interest in gardening, gardens, and plants. A flower club is a similar group with a focus on flowers.

History
The first and oldest organized garden club in the United States is the Ladies' Garden Club of Athens, Georgia. It started in 1891 with a gathering of twelve women friends who shared plants and plant cuttings. It was formally organized the following year.

Garden clubs formed in other American communities. The growth of garden clubs was one manifestation of the broader women's club movement of the late 19th and early 20th centuries. In 1913, the first national federation of garden clubs, the Garden Club of America, was established. It was followed in 1929 by the National Council of State Garden Clubs, now National Garden Clubs, Inc. By the 1930s, local garden clubs had formed in communities throughout the United States. Initially a women's activity, over time the garden club movement also engaged men, leading in 1932 to the establishment of the Men's Garden Clubs of America organization (now The Gardeners of America/Men's Garden Clubs of America).

Garden clubs did not limit themselves to the improvement of members' private gardens. Many clubs took an interest in civic beautification, planting trees along public streets, maintaining flower gardens in public spaces, and campaigning against billboards, which were considered "eyesores". The Garden Club of America began to crusade against billboards in 1919. Highway beautification and roadside improvement were a focus of attention for the Garden Club of Georgia from the time of its founding in 1928. In 1938 the Mississippi state garden club federation combined with the state federation of women's clubs and state roadside improvement council to campaign for state legislation to "get rid of ... unattractive signs and billboards that clutter the roads".

Many club members engaged in flower arranging as an activity. Clubs sponsored flower shows and club members participated in competitions as contestants and judges. This aspect of the American garden club movement led indirectly to the flower club movement in the United Kingdom in the years after World War II, when Julia Clements and other U.K. women who had observed flower arranging activities in North America returned home and encouraged their countrywomen to engage in similar activities.

Federations
Many local garden clubs in the United States are affiliated with one of three national federations: the Garden Club of America, National Garden Clubs, Inc. (originally the National Council of State Garden Clubs), and The Gardeners of America/Men's Garden Clubs of America. In the United Kingdom, many local flower clubs are affiliated with the National Association of Flower Arrangement Societies. The U.S.-based National Garden Clubs claims 447 affiliates outside the United States, in countries including Canada, Mexico, Bermuda, Brazil, South Africa, Australia, and Japan.

See also
Archives of American Gardens
Blue Star Memorial Highway

References

External links
 1891 First Garden Club historical marker
 America's First Garden Club historical marker

Horticultural organizations
Clubs and societies